Abar Aranye  (English title: In the Forest ...Again) (2003) is an Indian Bengali-language drama film directed by Goutom Ghosh.

Plot
The film features the characters from Satyajit Ray's Aranyer Din Ratri, returning to the forest over thirty years later. Ashim, Sanjoy, Harinath and Aparna have grown old in this film; Shekhar has died. They set out on a journey to break off every link with civilisation for a few days. However, the trip turns sour when Ashim and Aparna's daughter, Amrita, goes missing. It transpires that she is being held for ransom by local tribespeople. Police intervene and the kidnapped girl is returned to her parents, albeit against her own wishes.

Cast
 Soumitra Chatterjee as Ashim
 Sharmila Tagore as Aparna (wife of Ashim)
 Subhendu Chatterjee as Sanjoy
 Gulshan Ara Champa As Champa (wife of Sanjoy)
 Samit Bhanja as Hari
 Roopa Ganguly as Simul (wife of Hari)
 Tabu as Amrita (daughter of Ashim & Aparna)
 Saswata Chatterjee as Saswata (son of Sanjoy and Champa)
 Bidipta Chakraborty as Bidipta (wife of Saswata)
 Jisshu Sengupta as Jishu (friend of Saswata)
 Rajatava Dutta as manager of tea estate
 Chaiti Ghoshal as wife of manager

Awards
2004 :BFJA Awards
2004 :National Award - Best Director for Goutam Ghose
2004 :National Award - Best Screenplay for Goutam Ghose
2004 :National Award - Best Supporting Actress for Sharmila Tagore
2003 :Nominated for Montreal World Film Festival
2003 :Nominated  for International Film Festival of Marrakech

References

External links

 

2003 films
Bengali-language Indian films
Films directed by Goutam Ghose
Films whose director won the Best Director National Film Award
Films featuring a Best Supporting Actress National Film Award-winning performance
Films whose writer won the Best Original Screenplay National Film Award
2000s Bengali-language films